= Sri Rajagopala Swamy Temple, Bagavathapuram =

Sri Rajagopala Swamy Temple, Bagavathapuram is a Hindu temple located in Kumbakonam, Thanjavur district, Tamil Nadu. The temple is in Mannargudi and the nearest railway station to the temple is Nidamangalam, about 12 km.

The successor of Rajathi Raja Cholan is Kulothunga Cholan, who renovated the temple during the period of 1074-1125 AD.

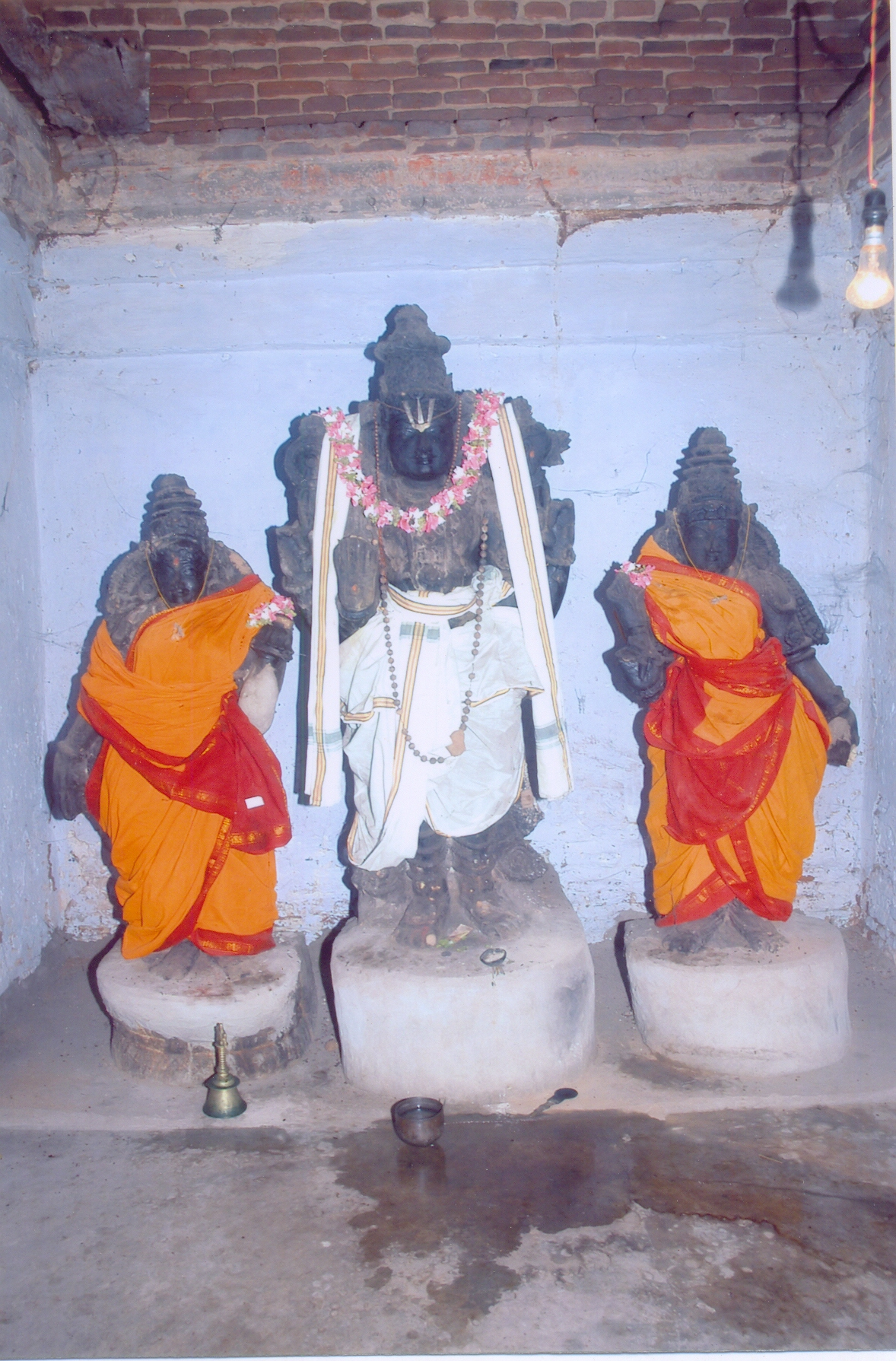
Sridevi Boodev Samedha Vasudeva Perumal

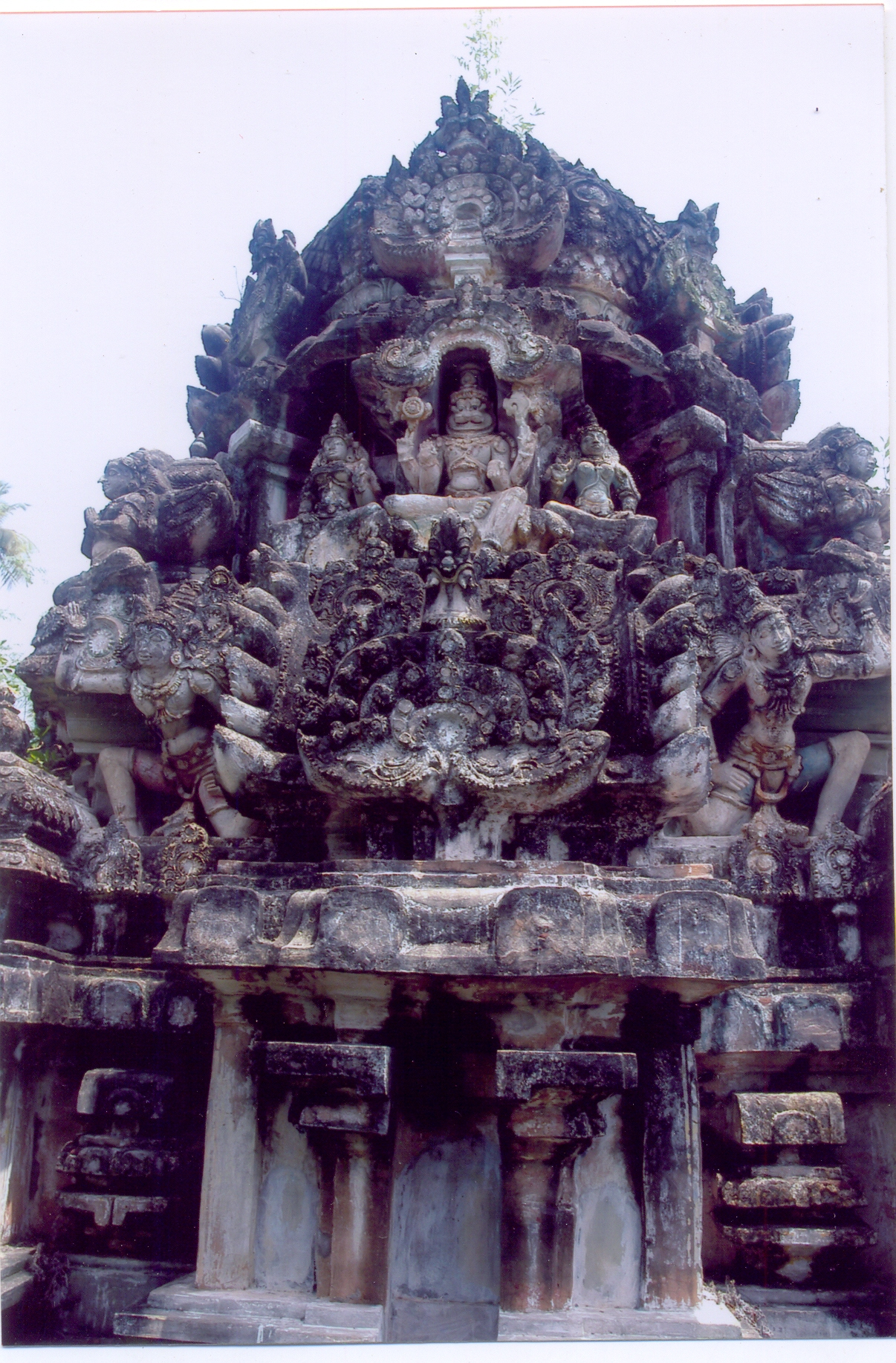
Garbha Griha Vimaanam

== Other Temples ==
- Sri Draupathy Amman Samedha Sri Dharmaraja Temple
- Sridevi Boodevi Samedha Vasudeva PerumalSri Mariamman Temple
